A fir is a type of evergreen coniferous tree.

Fir, FIR or F.I.R. may also refer to:

Entertainment
 F.I.R., a Taiwanese pop music group
 F.I.R. (album)
 F. I. R. (1999 film), a Malayalam action film
 FIR (2022 film), a Tamil-language action thriller film
 F.I.R. (TV series), an Indian sitcom
 Falling in Reverse, an American rock band
 FIR (2021 film), a Bengali crime thriller film

Science and technology
 Far infrared
 Finite impulse response
 Free ideal ring
 Flight information region
 FiR 1, the first nuclear reactor in Finland
 Research Institute for Operations Management, in Germany

Other uses
 Fir, an alternative spelling of Fier, a city in Albania
 Firan language (ISO 639-3 language code)
 First information report, a police document in some countries
 Flats Industrial Railroad, a former US company
 International Federation of Resistance Fighters – Association of Anti-Fascists
 Italian Rugby Federation
 USCGC Fir, 2 US Coast Guard ships

See also
 FIRS (disambiguation)
The Firs (disambiguation)

Fir is also the Irish Meaning for Men or Man and can be seen on Toilet doors in most public buildings in Ireland.